Palkar may refer to:
Saurashtra language
Saurashtra people